Ulla Qhaya (Aymara ulla cooked potato, qhaya store of potatoes, also spelled Ulla Khaya, Ullakaya), Jila Khayo, Huelancalloc, Huellancalloc or Pupuya is a  mountain in the Apolobamba mountain range in Bolivia. It is situated in the La Paz Department at the border of the Bautista Saavedra Province, Curva Municipality, and the Franz Tamayo Province, Pelechuco Municipality. Ulla Qhaya lies east of the lake Ch'uxña Quta and north-west of the mountain Iskillani.

References 

Mountains of La Paz Department (Bolivia)